Blessington in County Wicklow was a constituency represented in the Irish House of Commons from 1670 until 1800.

History
In the Patriot Parliament of 1689 summoned by King James II, Blessington was represented with two members.

Members of Parliament, 1670–1801

Notes

References

Bibliography

Constituencies of the Parliament of Ireland (pre-1801)
Historic constituencies in County Wicklow
1670 establishments in Ireland
1800 disestablishments in Ireland
Constituencies established in 1670
Constituencies disestablished in 1800